Heinz Peter Platter (born 8 March 1967) is an Italian former alpine skier.

Biography
At the end of his sporting career he became technical manager of the Swedish Alpine skiing national team. He was later hired by China to try and bring her to the 2022 Winter Olympics.

References

External links
 

1967 births
Living people
Italian male alpine skiers
Italian sports coaches
People from Prad am Stilfser Joch
Sportspeople from Südtirol
Italian alpine skiing coaches